Acrocercops tomia is a moth of the family Gracillariidae. It is known from Lord Howe Island.

References

tomia
Moths of Australia
Moths described in 1956